KSNP (97.7 FM, "97.7 The Dawg") is a radio station licensed to serve Burlington, Kansas, United States. The station, which began broadcasting in 1990, is currently owned by My Town Media, Inc.

KSNP broadcasts a classic rock music format to the Flint Hills region of eastern Kansas.

History
This station received its original construction permit from the Federal Communications Commission on October 31, 1989. The new station was assigned the call letters KSNP by the FCC on January 23, 1990. KSNP received its license to cover from the FCC on April 15, 1992.

In February 1999, Coffey County Broadcasting Company reached an agreement to sell the station to Southeast Kansas Broadcasting Company, Inc. The deal was approved by the FCC on April 26, 1999, and the transaction was completed on June 25, 1999.

References

External links
KSNP official website

SNP
Radio stations established in 1990
Coffey County, Kansas
Classic rock radio stations in the United States